Berrani Mosque is a historic mosque in the city of Algiers. The mosque is situated inside the UNESCO World Heritage Site Casbah of Algiers. It is located at the Bab Jadid Street, aligning with the entrance of Dar al-Sultan palace.

Etymology
The term "Berrani" was used to designate the people from outside of Algiers came for residence and employment.

History
The mosque was built by the Ottomans in 1653 nearby their palace in order to provide a prayer place for Berrani people who reside in the area. It was aimed at Berrani people who work outside the palace and were unable to enter the mosque inside the palace for security reasons. During the French occupation, the mosque was turned into a military barracks and later converted into a church. The French colonial authority designated the mosque as a cultural heritage in 1887. After the independence of Algeria, it was reconsecrated to the mosque.

In 2016, the urgent renovation of the roof was carried out under the supervision of the Bureau of the Management of Protected Cultural Property after a part of it collapsed. The collapse was due to winter rainwater eroding the central columns supporting the roof. The mosque, which is now around 360 years old, has been facing degrees of wear in other parts as well, including the foundations and the walls. The mosque was never renovated or restored by any designated institutions, including during the colonial era.

Notable Imams
 Mohamed Charef (1908-2011)

See also
 Algerian Islamic reference
 Hizb Rateb (Hezzab, Bash Hezzab, Salka)
 Lists of mosques
 List of mosques in Africa
 List of mosques in Algeria

References

External Links 

 Images of el-Barani Moque in Manar al-Athar digital heritage archive

17th-century mosques
Casbah of Algiers
Mosques in Algiers
Ottoman Mosques in Algeria